LaSalle Hotel is a historic hotel building located at South Bend, St. Joseph County, Indiana. It was built in 1921, and originally housed 223 hotel rooms. It is a nine-story, Commercial style brick building with terra cotta trim and a wide overhanging cornice. It is located next to the Hoffman Hotel and across the street from where the Chicago South Shore and South Bend Railroad's original South Bend station were once located. A tunnel connected the station and the hotel.

The LaSalle Hotel was listed on the National Register of Historic Places in 1985.

References

Hotel buildings on the National Register of Historic Places in Indiana
Hotel buildings completed in 1921
Buildings and structures in South Bend, Indiana
National Register of Historic Places in St. Joseph County, Indiana
Chicago school architecture in Indiana